Korzeniów may refer to the following places in Poland:

 Korzeniów, Podkarpackie Voivodeship
Korzeniów, Lublin Voivodeship